Xiao Jun (Chinese: 肖俊; born 31 August 1972) is a male Chinese sport shooter. He competed at the 1996 Atlanta Olympic Games, and won a silver medal in Men's 10 m Running Target.

References

1972 births
Living people
Chinese male sport shooters
Running target shooters
Olympic medalists in shooting
Shooters at the 1996 Summer Olympics
Olympic shooters of China
Olympic silver medalists for China
Medalists at the 1996 Summer Olympics
20th-century Chinese people